The Virginia Beach Open was a golf tournament on the PGA Tour. It was played annually from 1953 to 1955 at the Cavalier Yacht & Country Club in Virginia Beach, Virginia.

Winners

References 

Former PGA Tour events
Golf in Virginia
Sports in Virginia Beach, Virginia
Recurring sporting events established in 1953
Recurring sporting events disestablished in 1955
1953 establishments in Virginia
1955 disestablishments in Virginia